Winter Wonderland is a 1946 American drama film directed by Bernard Vorhaus, and written by Peter Goldbaum, David Chandler, Arthur Marx, and Gertrude Purcell. The film stars Lynne Roberts, Charles Drake, Roman Bohnen, Eric Blore, Elinor Donahue, and Renee Godfrey. The film was released on May 12, 1946, by Republic Pictures.

Plot

Cast   
Lynne Roberts as Nancy Wheeler
Charles Drake as Steve Kirk
Roman Bohnen as Timothy Wheeler
Eric Blore as Luddington
Elinor Donahue as Betty Wheeler 
Renee Godfrey as Phyllis Simpson
Janet Warren as Marge
Harry Tyler as Seth
Renie Riano as Mrs. Schuyler-Riggs
Diana Mumby as Telephone Operator
Alvin Hammer as Bellboy

References

External links 
 

1946 films
American drama films
1946 drama films
Republic Pictures films
Films directed by Bernard Vorhaus
Films scored by Paul Dessau
American black-and-white films
1940s English-language films
1940s American films